The Beijing–Shanhaiguan railway, abbreviated as the Jingshan Railway or the Jingyu Railway, is a branch railway that runs from the capital city of Beijing to the Shanhaiguan District of Qinhuangdao via Tianjin.  It contains a total of 22 stations.

Cities 
The railway passes through the following cities:
 Beijing
 Hebei: Langfang, Tangshan, Qinhuangdao
 Tianjin

Connecting railways 
In Beijing, the railway leaves Beijing railway station and branches off to form other railways, including the Beijing–Kowloon, Beijing–Guangzhou, and Fengtai–Shacheng railways.

In Tianjin, it intersects with the Tianjin–Jizhou railway, the Tianjin–Bazhou railway, the Tianjin–Pukou railway, and the Tianjin North Ring railway.  After it re-enters Hebei Province, the railroad will intersect with the Qidaoqiao–Luan County railway at Tangshan, as well as the Tangshan–Zunhua railway.  Afterwards, it meets with the Beijing–Qinhuangdao railway and follows a parallel path until the two finally come together with the Datong–Qinhuangdao railway at Qinhuangdao.

See also 

 Rail transport in China
 List of railways in China

Railway lines in China
Rail transport in Beijing
Rail transport in Tianjin
Rail transport in Hebei